Lucien Bodard (9 January 1914 – 2 March 1998) was a French reporter and writer on events in Asia.

Life 
Bodard was born on January 9, 1914, in Chongqing (central China) to the French consul Albert Bodard, who was stationed several years in China, i.e. in Chongqing, Chengdu, Kunming and Shanghai. He grew up with the Chinese language and spoke Mandarin fluently as a child. Later on, he moved to Kunming and Shanghai after his father was positioned there. Before he reached adolescence, his mother decided to send Bodard back to France to study in a "decent school".

His experience and knowledge of Asian cultures, mostly Chinese and Vietnamese, gave him a unique perspective on events that shook the Asian world during the first half of the twentieth century. In 1944, he began his career as journalist and was sent to the Far East to cover various topics such as the south-east Asian war and the rise of communist China, First Indochina war. He progressively became one of the most famous French war correspondents for his work during the first French Indochina war and then the beginning of the American Vietnam war, wars which he later described in several books.

As he grew older, in the 1970s, he started writing novels which were essentially based on his knowledge of Asia, starting with his souvenirs when he was a child in China. His rich, baroque, detailed and sometimes humoristic style drew broad applause, and he won several French literary prizes, including the Prix Interallié for "Monsieur le consul", a book on his father while he was the French Consul in Chengdu and the Prix Goncourt for "Anne Marie", a book on the life and personality of his mother. His last book, "Le chien de Mao" (Mao's Dog), on Mao Zedong's third wife Jiang Qing, was published in 1998, the year of his death.

He has been often compared to two other famous 20th century French journalists and novelists, Albert Londres and Joseph Kessel.

Notable books 
 The Quicksand War: Prelude to Vietnam (1963)
 La Guerre d'Indochine (1965-1967)
 Monsieur Le Consul (Paris,: B. Grasset, 1973) translated: The French Consul (New York:Knopf, 1977)
 Le Fils Du Consul (Paris: Grasset, 1975) The Consul's Son (1975)
 Anne-Marie (1981)
 Le Chien de Mao (1998)

Filmography

Biography 
 Olivier Weber, Lucien Bodard, Un aventurier dans le siècle, Plon, 1997, 1021 pages

Documentary 
 Lucien Bodard, dit Lulu le Chinois, a film from Olivier Weber and Michel Vuillermet, France 5, 1998
 Documentary 52': Lucien Bodard

External links 
 

1914 births
1998 deaths
Writers from Chongqing
French war correspondents
French travel writers
20th-century French writers
20th-century French male writers
20th-century French journalists
French sinologists
French historical novelists
Prix Goncourt winners
Prix Interallié winners
Burials at Montparnasse Cemetery
French male non-fiction writers
French expatriates in China